Roederer is a spelling variant of the German surname Röderer. Notable people with the surname include:

 Louis Roederer, a Champagne house, or its founder
 Pierre Louis Roederer (1754–1835), French politician and historian
 Antoine Marie Roederer (1782–1865), a French politician, son of Pierre Roederer
 Johann Georg Roederer (1726–1763), a German physician
 Karl Röderer (1868–1928), a Swiss sports shooter
 Juan Gualterio Roederer (born 1929), an Italian-born Argentine-American academic administrator and physicist